Serpent or The Serpent may refer to:

 Snake, a carnivorous reptile of the suborder Serpentes

Mythology and religion

 Sea serpent, a monstrous ocean creature 
 Serpent symbolism, the snake in religious rites and mythological contexts
 Serpents in the Bible, notably one in the Old Testament Garden of Eden
 Snakes in Chinese mythology
 Snakes in mythology

Arts and entertainment
 Serpent (novel), a 1999 novel by Clive Cussler
 Serpent (roller coaster), a steel roller coaster at Six Flags AstroWorld
 Serpent (video game), a 1990 Game Boy action video game
 The Serpent, a play created by The Open Theater
 "The Serpent" (Da Vinci's Demons), second episode of the American TV series Da Vinci's Demons
 The Serpent (novel), a 1963 novel by Jane Gaskell
 "The Serpent" (Once Upon a Time in Wonderland), an episode of the series Once Upon a Time in Wonderland
 The Serpent (TV series), a 2021 miniseries co-produced by BBC One and Netflix

Film
 Le Serpent, a 1973 French film released in English as Night Flight from Moscow
 The Serpent (1916 film), starring Theda Bara
 The Serpent (1920 film), a 1920 Italian silent film
 The Serpent (2006 film), a French film Le Serpent
 The Serpent, a 2021 film produced, directed and starring Gia Skova

Music
 Serpent (album), 2011 album by Circle
 Serpent, heavy metal band featuring Piotr Wawrzeniuk
 Serpent (instrument), a member of the brass family
 The Serpent (album), 2007 album by Still Remains, or the title track
 "The Serpent", a song from the 1969 Genesis album From Genesis to Revelation
 Thy Serpent, a Finnish black metal band

Computing
 One of the programming languages used in Ethereum
 Serpent (cipher), in cryptography
 Serpent (software), a continuous-energy Monte Carlo particle transport code

Constellations
 Hydra (constellation), the many-headed serpent killed by Heracles
 Hydrus, the water snake, is a minor southern constellation
 Serpens, which represents a snake being tamed by the snake-handler Ophiuchus

Toponyms
 Serpent Lake, a lake in Minnesota, US
 Serpent River, a tributary of the Mégiscane River in Quebec, Canada

Other uses
 Charles Sobhraj (born 1944), serial killer nicknamed "The Serpent" 
 HMS Serpent, several British Royal Navy ships
 Serpent Model Racing Cars, a radio-controlled car manufacturer from the Netherlands

See also
 
 
 Dragon (disambiguation)
 Serpentine (disambiguation)
 Serpentor, a fictional character from the G.I. Joe: A Real American Hero cartoon series
 Snake (disambiguation)
 World Serpent (disambiguation)